FC Genç Kalemler (FK Gench Kalemler) is a football club of the Turkish community based in the village of Dolna Banjica near Gostivar, North Macedonia. They are currently competing in the OFS Gostivar league.

History
The club was founded in 2015. Three years after the foundation of the club they already got promoted to the Second Macedonian League after having won the Third League West.

Current squad
As of 18 September 2018

References

External links 
FC Genç Kalemler Facebook 
Club info at MacedonianFootball 
Football Federation of Macedonia 

Genç Kalemler
Association football clubs established in 2015
2015 establishments in the Republic of Macedonia
FC
Turkish association football clubs outside Turkey